Stelios Ioannou (Greek: Στέλιος Ιωάννου; born July 28, 1987 in Athens, Greece) is a Greek professional basketball player. He is 6'7" and plays at the shooting guard position.

Professional career
After playing in the top-tier level Greek Basket League with Ilysiakos, Panionios, KAOD, and Panelefsiniakos, Ioannou signed with the Greek 2nd Division club, Doxa Lefkadas, in 2015.

Personal life
Ioannou is the son of professional basketball coach Memos Ioannou, who was also a former professional basketball player, of Panathinaikos, and the senior men's Greek national basketball team.

References

External links
Eurobasket.com Profile
Draftexpress.com Profile
Greek Basket League Profile 

1987 births
Living people
Doxa Lefkadas B.C. players
Greek men's basketball players
Ilysiakos B.C. players
K.A.O.D. B.C. players
Panionios B.C. players
Panelefsiniakos B.C. players
Shooting guards
Small forwards
Basketball players from Athens